K2-187, also known as EPIC 212157262, is a Sun-like star in K2 Campaign 5. It is very close in size and temperature to the Sun, and has a system of four confirmed exoplanets ranging between 1.4  and 3.2 . The innermost planet takes just 18 hours to orbit its star, while the outermost planet orbits every 2 weeks.

Planetary system
K2-187 has at least four orbiting exoplanets: two Super-Earths, one Hot Neptune, and one Mini-Neptune. All four planets are in near-resonances with each other and are far too hot for life.

References

Planetary systems with four confirmed planets
Planetary transit variables
G-type main-sequence stars
J08500566+2311333
Cancer (constellation)